The Princess Sophia's Precedence Act 1711 (10 Ann c 8) is an Act of the Parliament of Great Britain.

It reiterated the Act of Settlement 1701, that the line of succession to the British throne, in the absence of any children of Queen Anne, passed directly to Electress Sophia of Hanover and "the heirs of her body being Protestants". As such, Sophia was heir presumptive, followed by her children.

This being so, it provided that the formal order of precedence be modified to reflect this; Sophia was given precedence after Queen Anne, followed by her son George; any other Protestant heirs of Sophia were to take precedence before the Archbishop of Canterbury, the great officers of state and the nobility, effectively ranking them with the royal family.

This Act was wholly in force in Great Britain at the end of 2010.

References
Halsbury's Statutes,

External links
The Princess Sophia's Precedence Act 1711, as amended, from Legislation.gov.uk

Great Britain Acts of Parliament 1711
British royalty
Succession to the British crown
Sophia of Hanover